As of September 2009, Swedish alternative rock band Kent has released many original songs on eight studio albums, one EP, one compilation album...

Swedish

Album songs

Kent (1995)
"Blåjeans"
"Som vatten"
"Ingenting någonsin"
"När det blåser på månen"
"Jag vill inte vara rädd"
"Vad två öron klarar"
"Den osynlige mannen"
"Pojken med hålet i handen"
"Ingen kommer att tro dig"
"Stenbrott"
"Frank"

Verkligen (1996)
"Avtryck" (Imprint)
"Kräm (så nära får ingen gå)"
"Gravitation"
"Istället för ljud"
"10 minuter (för mig själv)"
"En timme en minut"
"Indianer"
"Halka"
"Thinner"
"Vi kan väl vänta tills imorgon"

Isola (1997)
"Livräddaren"
"Om du var här"
"Saker man ser"
"Oprofessionell"
"OWC"*
"Celsius"
"Bianca"
"Innan allting tar slut"
"Elvis"
"Glider"
"747"

Hagnesta Hill (1999)
"Kungen är död"
"Revolt III"
"Musik non stop"
"Kevlarsjäl"
"Ett tidsfördriv att dö för"
"Stoppa mig juni (Lilla ego)"
"En himmelsk drog"
"Stanna hos mig"
"Cowboys"
"Beskyddaren"
"Berg & dalvana"
"Insekter"
"Visslaren"

Vapen & ammunition (2002)
"Sundance Kid"
"Pärlor"
"Dom andra"
"Duett" (with Titiyo)
"Hur jag fick dig att älska mig"
"Kärleken väntar"
"Socker"
"FF"
"Elite"
"Sverige"

Du & jag döden (2005)
"400 slag"
"Du är ånga"
"Den döda vinkeln"
"Du var min armé"
"Palace & Main"
"Järnspöken"*
"Klåparen"
"Max 500"
"Romeo återvänder ensam"
"Rosor & palmblad"
"Mannen i den vita hatten (16 år senare)"

Tillbaka till samtiden (2007)
 "Elefanter"
 "Berlin"
 "Ingenting"
 "Vid din sida"
 "Columbus"
 "Sömnen"
 "Vy från ett luftslott"
 "Våga vara rädd"
 "LSD, någon?"
 "Generation Ex"
 "Ensammast i Sverige"

Röd (2009)
 "18:29-4"
 "Taxmannen"
 "Krossa allt"
 "Hjärta"
 "Sjukhus"
 "Vals för Satan (Din vän pessimisten)"
 "Idioter"
 "Svarta linjer"
 "Ensamheten"
 "Töntarna"
 "Det finns inga ord"

En plats i solen (2010)
 "Glasäpplen"
 "Ismael"
 "Skisser för sommaren"
 "Ärlighet Respekt Kärlek"
 "Varje gång du möter min blick"
 "Ensam lång väg hem"
 "Team building"
 "Gamla Ullevi"
 "Minimalen"
 "Passagerare"

Jag är inte rädd för mörkret (2012)
"999"
"Petroleum"
"Isis & Bast"
"Jag Ser Dig"
"Tänd på"
"Beredd på Allt"*
"Ruta 1"
"Färger på Natten"
"Låt Dom Komma"
"Hänsyn"

Tigerdrottningen (2014)
"Mirage"
"Var Är Vi Nu"
"Skogarna"
"La Belle Epoque"
"Svart Snö"
"Allt Har Sin Tid"*
"Innan Himlen Faller Ner"
"Din Enda Vän"
"Godhet"
"Simmaren"
"Den Andra Sidan"

Då Som Nu för Alltid (2016)
"Andromeda"
"Tennsoldater"
"Vi Är för Alltid"
"Den Vänstra Stranden"
"Nattpojken & Nattflickan"
"Vi Är Inte Längre Där"*
"Förlåtelsen"
"Skyll inte ifrån Dig"
"Gigi"
"Falska Profeter"
"Den Sista Sången"

B-sides

English

Album Songs

B Sides

Kent
Kent songs